Beyhud (also Romanized as Beyhūd and Beyhūt) is a village in Zibad Rural District, Kakhk District, Gonabad County, Razavi Khorasan Province, Iran. At the 2006 census, its population was 205, in 65 families.

See also 

 List of cities, towns and villages in Razavi Khorasan Province

References 

Populated places in Gonabad County